York Avenue, Sutton Place, and Sutton Place South are the names of segments of a North-South thoroughfare in the Yorkville, Lenox Hill, and Sutton Place neighborhoods of the East Side of Manhattan, in New York City. York Avenue runs from 59th to 92nd Streets through eastern Lenox Hill and Yorkville on the Upper East Side. Sutton Place and Sutton Place South run through their namesake neighborhood along the East River and south of the Queensboro Bridge. Sutton Place South runs from 57th to 53rd Streets.  Unlike most North-South streets in Manhattan, street numbers along Sutton Place South increase when headed South.  Sutton Place runs from 57th to 59th Streets. The streets are considered among the city's most affluent, and both portions are known for upscale apartments, much like the rest of the Upper East Side.

Addresses on York Avenue are continuous with that of Avenue A in the Alphabet City neighborhood, starting in the 1100 series and rising to the 1700 series. Addresses on Sutton Place and Sutton Place South do not follow the usual pattern in Manhattan.

The greater Sutton Place neighborhood, which sits north of the neighborhood of Turtle Bay, runs from 53rd Street to 59th Street and is bounded on the east by the East River and on the west by either First Avenue or Second Avenue. Sutton Square is the cul-de-sac at the end of East 58th Street, just east of Sutton Place; Riverview Terrace is a row of townhouses on a short private driveway that runs north from Sutton Square.

History

Early years

The street that became York Avenue and Sutton Place was proposed as an addition to the Commissioners' Plan of 1811 for Manhattan, which designated 12 broad north-south avenues running the length of the island. The geography of Manhattan left a large area on the Upper East Side east of First Avenue without a major north-south thoroughfare, so Avenue A was added to compensate. Sutton Place, the name that applied to the whole street at the time, was originally one of several disconnected stretches of Avenue A built where space allowed, east of First Avenue.

In 1875, Effingham B. Sutton constructed a group of brownstones between 57th and 58th Streets. The earliest source found by The New York Times using the term Sutton Place dates to 1883. At that time, the New York City Board of Aldermen approved a petition to change the name from "Avenue A" to "Sutton Place", covering the blocks between 57th and 60th Streets. The block between 59th and 60th Streets is now considered a part of York Avenue.

Sutton Place first became fashionable around 1920, when several wealthy socialites, including Anne Harriman Vanderbilt and Anne Morgan, built townhouses on the eastern side of the street, overlooking the East River. Both townhouses were designed by Mott B. Schmidt, launching a career that included many houses for the wealthy. Very shortly thereafter, developers started to build grand co-operative apartment houses on Sutton Place and Sutton Place South, including several designed by Rosario Candela. Development came to an abrupt halt with the Great Depression, and the luxury apartment buildings on the lower part of Sutton Place South (below 57th Street) and the northernmost part of Sutton Place (adjacent to the Queensboro Bridge) were not developed until the 1940s and 1950s.

In 1906, The Rockefeller Institute (the predecessor to The Rockefeller University) moved its laboratories to the site of the former Schermerhorn farm at York Avenue (then called Avenue A) and 66th Street. John D. Rockefeller purchased the land from the Schermerhorn estate between Avenue A and the East River extending from 64th Street to 67th Street  in 1903  The Rockefeller Institute Hospital opened in 1910.

In 1912, New York Hospital became affiliated with the Cornell University Medical College and in 1932 moved to its current location, a joint facility, the New York Hospital-Cornell Medical Center, on York Avenue between East 67th and 68th Streets. In 1998, NY Hospital merged with Presbyterian Hospital to become NewYork–Presbyterian Hospital (NYP) and the site functions as one of the main campuses of NYP. In 2019, NYP was ranked as 5th Best Hospital in the United States.
On the west side of Avenue A, across the street from the Rockefeller Institute, in 1925, the Rockefeller Garden Apartments opened.  These were meant to be affordable housing, "good homes for low rents" for people with children.

In 1928, a one-block section of Sutton Place north of 59th Street, and all of Avenue A north of that point, was renamed York Avenue to honor U.S. Army Sergeant Alvin York, who received the Medal of Honor during World War I's Meuse-Argonne Offensive. York, commanding only a few men took over 125 German soldiers as prisoners. York's feat made him a national hero and international celebrity among allied nations.

In 1932, New York Hospital and Cornell University Medical College (which affiliated in 1913) moved to its current location, a joint facility, the New York Hospital-Cornell Medical Center, on York Avenue at 68th Street. In 1998, NY Hospital merged with Presbyterian Hospital to become NewYork–Presbyterian Hospital (NYP) and the site functions as one of the main campuses of NYP.

In 1939, the Memorial Hospital opened on York Avenue, between 67th and 68th Streets, on land donated by John D. Rockefeller, Jr.

Park controversy
Sutton Place encompasses two public parks overlooking the East River, one at the end of 57th Street and another at the end of 53rd Street. The 57th Street park, named Sutton Place Park, is separated by an iron fence from the landscaped grounds behind One Sutton Place South, a neo-Georgian apartment building designed by Rosario Candela. The property behind One Sutton Place South was the subject of a dispute between the building's owners and the New York City Department of Parks and Recreation. Like the adjacent park, the rear garden at One Sutton Place South is, in fact, cantilevered over the FDR Drive, a busy parkway at Manhattan's eastern edge that is not visible from most of Sutton Place.

In 1939, city authorities took ownership of the property behind One Sutton Place South by eminent domain in connection with the construction of the FDR Drive, then leased it back to the building for $1 a year. The building's lease for its backyard expired in 1990. The co-op tried unsuccessfully to extend the lease, and later made prospective apartment-buyers review the legal status of the backyard and sign a confidentiality agreement. In June 2007, the co-op sued the city in an attempt the keep the land, and on November 1, 2011, the co-op and the city reached an agreement in which the co-op ended its ownership claim to the eastern 6,000 square feet and the city relinquished its claim to the western 4,000 square feet (the land closest to the building). Each side also agreed to contribute $1 million toward the creation of a public park on the City’s portion.

Notable residents

Former and current residents of Sutton Place include architect I. M. Pei; socialite Consuelo Vanderbilt Balsan of the Vanderbilt family; French-American writer, journalist and pianist Eve Curie; cabaret singer and pianist Bobby Short; rock stars Freddie Mercury and Michael Jackson; actor Peter Lawford and his wife Patricia Kennedy Lawford of the Kennedy family; Ziegfeld Girl and businesswoman Irene Hayes; actresses Lillian Gish, Joan Crawford, Mildred Natwick, Maureen O'Hara, Sigourney Weaver, and Marilyn Monroe and her then-husband Arthur Miller; actress and interior decorator Elsie de Wolfe and actress, fashion designer and socialite C. Z. Guest; clothing designers Bill Blass and Kenneth Cole and interior designer Valerian Rybar; shipping magnate Aristotle Onassis; banker Richard Jenrette; hedge fund manager Raj Rajaratnam; Steven Hoffenberg, founder of Towers Financial Corporation, a debt collection agency; John Fairchild, publisher of Women’s Wear Daily; politician and business leader Percy Sutton; "Preppy Killer" Robert Chambers and his ex-girlfriend, Shawn Kovell; former New York Governor Mario Cuomo; and all UN Secretaries-General since Kurt Waldheim.

Points of interest

One Sutton Place North, a townhouse at the northeast corner of Sutton Place (dead end) and East 57th Street, was built as a residence for Anne Harriman Vanderbilt, widow of William K. Vanderbilt. These townhouses have a park at the rear with FDR Drive running below (Sutton Place Tunnel) along the East River.

The auction house Sotheby's is headquartered on York Avenue.

In popular culture

1935/37 – Sutton Place at East 53rd Street is the Dead End of the play and movie of that name, which began the movie careers of the Dead End Kids.
1936 – The lyric for Rodgers and Hart's On Your Toes mentions Sutton Place as a desirable address: "This motto applies to folks who dwell in Richmond Hill or New Rochelle, in Chelsea or In Sutton Place."
1936 – The movie My Man Godfrey starring William Powell was about a hobo in a hobo jungle that once was adjacent the  Queensboro Bridge and "Sutton Place" is mentioned frequently in the movie as where Godfrey the butler was found and hired. 
1947 – In John Cheever's short story "The Enormous Radio", the main characters, Jim and Irene Wescott, live in an apartment in the Sutton Place neighborhood.
1948 – 43 Sutton Place is the home of Leona and Henry Stevenson (Barbara Stanwyck and Burt Lancaster) in the film noir Sorry, Wrong Number.  Most scenes take place late one evening as Leona frantically tries to solve a murder plot that she overhears on the telephone. Through her bedroom window are night views of the Queensboro Bridge.
1948 – 1 Sutton Place North is the home of Alison Courtland (Claudette Colbert) and her husband Richard (Don Ameche) in Douglas Sirk's film noir Sleep, My Love.
1951 – Sutton Place is mentioned in J. D. Salinger's novel Catcher in the Rye as the location of a "swanky" apartment.
1953 – 36 Sutton Place South was an exterior location for the film How to Marry a Millionaire starring Marilyn Monroe.
1958 – Sutton Place is featured in the "Lady Bug, Lady Bug" episode of the TV show Naked City.
1960 – Sutton Place is featured in the film Satan in High Heels.
1966 – The Avenue A Estate on Sutton Place was the site of the "East End Hotel," the home of Ann Marie in That Girl.
1970 – In an article in New York magazine, Tom Wolfe mentions "the famous Mrs. C--------, one of New York’s richest widows, who has a 10-room duplex on Sutton Place, the good part of Sutton Place as opposed to the Miami Beach-looking part". The article was later reprinted in the book Radical Chic & Mau-Mauing the Flak Catchers.
1973 – Sutton Place is featured in Larry Cohen's film Black Caesar. 
1983 – Sutton Square, the cul-de-sac at the end of East 58th Street just east of Sutton Place, was depicted as the home of the lead character (a wealthy playwright) in the Dudley Moore film Romantic Comedy. 
1983 – Scarface had a scene in which Tony Montana (Al Pacino) was on the telephone in the now-defunct 60th Street Heliport, now used as a dog run.
1984 – On his album New Sensations, Lou Reed, in the song "High in the City", sings: "Let's not walk down Sutton Place; you know everybody there's got Akitas."
1986 – In the film Legal Eagles, the villain, Victor Taft (Terence Stamp), resided on Sutton Place.
1987 – In Oliver Stone's film Wall Street, an excited broker (Sylvia Miles) offers to show Bud Fox (Charlie Sheen) some apartments on Sutton Place once she realizes how wealthy he is.
2000 – In the film Almost Famous, Patrick Fugit's character is seen sprinting down Sutton Place.
2007 – 50 Sutton Place South was one of the buildings used to film American Gangster.
2008 – Sutton Place is the location of the home of the main character in Mary Higgins Clark's novel Where Are You Now?.  Clark owns an apartment in the neighborhood, and in several books her characters occasionally dine at Neary's, an actual Irish bar and restaurant located on East 57th Street between First and Second Avenues.
2013 – Vampire Weekend's song "Hudson", on their album Modern Vampires of the City, contains the line "But I was born on Sutton Place".

See also
2006 New York City plane crash, a crash just off of York Avenue/Sutton Place on October 11, 2006
Beekman Place
Pleasant Avenue

References

External links

Neighborhoods in Manhattan
Streets in Manhattan
Sutton Place Park
Midtown Manhattan
Upper East Side

de:Sutton Place (Manhattan)
es:Sutton Place (Manhattan)